The 1962 NCAA Men's Soccer Tournament was the fourth organized men's college soccer tournament by the National Collegiate Athletic Association, to determine the top college soccer team in the United States. The Saint Louis Billikens won their third title, defeating the Maryland Terrapins, 4–3, in the final on November 24, 1962. It was the second straight tournament played in St. Louis, Missouri.

Teams

Bracket

See also
 1962 NAIA Soccer Championship

References 

Championship
NCAA Division I Men's Soccer Tournament seasons
NCAA
NCAA
NCAA Soccer Tournament
NCAA Soccer Tournament